Matrusri Nagar (() (() is a residential area near Miyapur cross Road. It is located 20.9 kilometres (12.9 mi) northwest of Hyderabad, is part of Greater Hyderabad and administered by GHMC and developed by HMDA. Transportation is managed by UMTA. Telugu is the local language.

Transportation
Hafeezpet railway station and Chandanagar railway station are the nearby railway stations to Matrusri Nagar. Hyderabad Deccan railway station is the major railway station which is about 16 km near to Matrusri Nagar.

Hafeezpet Bus Station, Miyapur Bus Station, Miyapur cross Roads Bus Station, Kondapur Bus Station, and Deepthisree Bus Station are the nearby bus stations. Buses run to a number of places.

Miyapur Metro station is also located beside Matrusri nagar bus stand, providing even better and faster connectivity to various areas in the city.

Administration 
Matrusri Nagar is a part of Serilingampally Mandal. It was formerly part of Manchal Mandal. Matrusri Nagar is a part of Serilingampally (52) Assembly constituency. Matrusri Nagar is a part of Chevella Lok Sabha constituency.

Society
Matrusri Nagar Residents Welfare Association takes care of this area.(MRWA)

See also
Telangana Legislative Assembly
Ranga Reddy district
Miyapur
Hafeezpet

References

Geography of Hyderabad, India